The Snow Maiden (tr.:Snegurochka) is a 1952 Soviet/Russian traditionally animated feature film.  It was produced at the Soyuzmultfilm studio in Moscow and is based on the Slavic-pagan play of the same name by Aleksandr Ostrovsky (itself largely based on traditional folk tales).  Music from Nikolai Rimsky-Korsakov's opera The Snow Maiden is used, arranged for the film by L. Shvarts. The animated film was shown at movie theaters.

The film is listed as being in the public domain on the website of the Russian Federal Agency of Culture and Cinematography. 
The film also lapsed into the public domain in the United States when its US copyright expired, but the copyright was restored under the GATT treaty.

Plot
Snegurochka (the Snow Maiden), the daughter of Spring the Beauty (Весна-Красна) and Ded Moroz, yearns for the companionship of mortal humans. She grows to like the Slavic god-shepherd named Lel, but her heart is unable to know love. Her mother takes pity and gives her this ability, but as soon as she falls in love, her heart warms up and she melts.

Creators

Creation history
In the first half of the 1950s the Soyuzmultfilm studio releases known movies of the "classical" direction — mainly children's, often based on application of "eclair" (rotoscoping). During this period such well-known tapes as "The Tale of the Fisherman and a Small Fish" (1950), "Kashtanka" (1952) M. M. Tsekhanovsky, and "The Snow Maiden" (1952) I. P. Ivanov-Vano, etc. are removed. In the movie "Snow Maiden" the innovative artistic touch offered by V. A. Nikitin — use of luminescent paints was used.

The edition on video
In the early 1980ss the animated film started being issued the Videoprogramma Goskino of the USSR video company initially on import, since 1984 on the Soviet cartridges "VK Electronics". Since 1990 the animated film is released by the film association "Krupnyy Plan" on videotapes. In the mid-nineties Studio PRO Video published the animated film on VHS in the collection of the best Soviet animated films Frost Ivanovich, Wonderful Hand Bell, Sister Alyonushka and Brother Ivanushka, Vasilisa Mikulishna, Lie's Swans and The Tale of the Fisherman and Small Fish. Since 1995, the Union of Video studio republished this animated film on VHS.

From the first half the 2000s, the animated film was restored and released on DVD by Soyuz Video studio.

See also
 History of Russian animation
 List of animated feature films

References

External links
 
  (Official Russian)
  (Russian with English subtitles)
 Snegurochka at the Animator.ru (English and Russian)

1952 animated films
1952 films
1950s Christmas films
Films based on fairy tales
Films based on works by Alexander Ostrovsky
Films based on Russian folklore
Films directed by Ivan Ivanov-Vano
1950s Russian-language films
Soviet animated films
Soyuzmultfilm
Russian children's fantasy films
1950s children's fantasy films
Soviet Christmas films
Snegurochka
Soviet children's films